Boulevard Gardens is a census-designated place (CDP) in Broward County, Florida, United States. The population was 1,274 at the 2010 census.

Geography
Boulevard Gardens is located at  (26.124114, -80.182217).

According to the United States Census Bureau, the CDP has a total area of 0.7 km2 (0.3 mi2), all land.

Demographics

As of the census of 2000, there were 1,415 people, 451 households, and 312 families living in the CDP.  The population density was 2,101.3/km2 (5,376.5/mi2).  There were 489 housing units at an average density of 726.2/km2 (1,858.0/mi2).  The racial makeup of the CDP was 2.47% White (2% were Non-Hispanic White,) 94.13% African American, 0.21% Native American, 0.35% Asian, 0.78% from other races, and 2.05% from two or more races. Hispanic or Latino of any race were 2.40% of the population.

There were 451 households, out of which 26.2% had children under the age of 18 living with them, 28.8% were married couples living together, 30.8% had a female householder with no husband present, and 30.6% were non-families. 20.8% of all households were made up of individuals, and 7.3% had someone living alone who was 65 years of age or older.  The average household size was 3.14 and the average family size was 3.72.

In the CDP, the population was spread out, with 29.9% under the age of 18, 10.3% from 18 to 24, 25.7% from 25 to 44, 21.6% from 45 to 64, and 12.5% who were 65 years of age or older.  The median age was 32 years. For every 100 females, there were 94.9 males.  For every 100 females age 18 and over, there were 91.1 males.

The median income for a household in the CDP was $22,167, and the median income for a family was $26,719. Males had a median income of $19,934 versus $20,288 for females. The per capita income for the CDP was $14,843.  About 25.6% of families and 37.4% of the population were below the poverty line, including 42.3% of those under age 18 and 22.4% of those age 65 or over.

As of 2000, English was the first language for 100% of the population.

References

Census-designated places in Broward County, Florida
Census-designated places in Florida